The 1892 Cirencester by-election was held on 18 October 1892 after the retirement of the incumbent Liberal MP Arthur Brend Winterbotham.  The seat was gained by the Conservative candidate Thomas Chester-Master. Chester-Master was originally declared the victor by 3 votes, but on petition and after scrutiny, the votes were declared equal and a new election was held.

References 

1892 in England
1892 elections in the United Kingdom
19th century in Gloucestershire
Annulled elections
By-elections to the Parliament of the United Kingdom in Gloucestershire constituencies